Sunway may refer to:

Places
 Bandar Sunway, also called Sunway or Sunway City, a township in Petaling Jaya, Selangor, Malaysia

Brands and enterprises
 Sunway (processor), a series of Chinese computer microprocessors
 Sunway Group, a Malaysian conglomerate
Sunway Lagoon, a theme park in Bandar Sunway
Sunway Pyramid, a shopping mall in Bandar Sunway
Sunway Putra Mall, previously known as The Mall or Putra Place,  a shopping mall located along Jalan Putra in Kuala Lumpur, Malaysia
Sunway Velocity Mall, connected to Cochrane MRT station by a 198-metre bridge

Transportation
BRT Sunway Line, a bus rapid transit (BRT) line that is part of the Klang Valley Integrated Transit System
Sunway Lagoon BRT station, serves the Sunway Lagoon in Bandar Sunway, on the BRT Sunway Line
Sunway Monorail, in Malaysia